"Champions" is a song by American singer Usher and Panamanian singer Rubén Blades, recorded for the biographical sports film, Hands of Stone and is also included on his eight studio album Hard II Love. It was released by RCA on August 26, 2016, available for digital download and online streaming. The song was written by Usher, Rubén Blades, Raphael Saadiq and Taura Stinson.

Background and release
Following Usher's 2012 album Looking 4 Myself, his next studio album was expected to be released in 2014. "Good Kisser", "She Came to Give It to You" and "I Don't Mind" were released and he also embarked on the UR Experience Tour, yet no album was released. In October 2015, Usher released "Chains", a song about social justice featuring the artists Nas and Bibi Bourelly. The singer released "Crash" on June 10, 2016 available for digital download on iTunes, Amazon, Google Play and online streaming services, Tidal, Apple Music, Spotify, and YouTube.

Music video
On August 29, 2016, the official music video was uploaded to the Usher's YouTube and Vevo channel. During the music video various clips of Hands of Stone are played.

Credits and personnel
Credits adapted from Tidal.

Usher — lead vocals, composer, lyricist
Rubén Blades — lead vocals, composer, lyricist
Raphael Saadiq — composer, lyricist
Taura Stinson — composer, lyricist

References

Usher (musician) songs
Rubén Blades songs
Songs written by Rubén Blades
Songs written by Usher (musician)
2016 songs
RCA Records singles
Songs written by Raphael Saadiq
Songs written by Taura Stinson